Mia Sinclair Jenness (born December 14, 2005) is an American teen theater actress. She was one of three girls who rotated as the star title character on the US tour for Matilda the Musical. In the off-Broadway play Mary Page Marlowe, she portrays the 12-year-old version of Mary.  In 2018, she voiced the title character Nancy Clancy on Disney Junior's animated television series Fancy Nancy. She also had an ensemble and understudy role on the 2014–15 Broadway production of Les Miserables. She portrayed Lily Nill in the pilot episode for the TV series Panic. She voices young Powder in the Netflix League of Legends-based series Arcane.

Personal life 
Jenness grew up in Millburn, New Jersey and is the daughter of actress Emily Bauer. In 2012, at age six, she participated in the play And a Child Shall Lead, which is about the Terezin concentration camp. Her brother, Brady Jenness, is also an actor.

References 

2005 births
Living people
People from Millburn, New Jersey
American voice actresses
American child actresses
21st-century American women